The Soap Opera Encyclopedia may refer to:

 The Soap Opera Encyclopedia (Schemering book), a 1985 reference book by Christopher Schemering
 The Soap Opera Encyclopedia (Waggett book), a 1997 reference book by Gerard J. Waggett